Etowah High School was a public high school in Etowah, Tennessee. It was a part of McMinn County Schools.

It was built in 1925 and had two stories.

Circa 1951, when Kenneth Barker began his term as a principal, there were 320 students.

The number of students was 416, during the 1955-1956 school year.

By 1958 enrollment was up to 448. That year several students criticized what the Associated Press stated that they stated was a "deplorable" state, and the students did a walkout. This walkout lasted for at least four days.

The school consolidated into McMinn Central High School in 1966. The McMinn County School District set up an auction for the Etowah High land, with the Etowah city government being one of the bidders.

See also
 Etowah City School

References

Education in McMinn County, Tennessee
Educational institutions disestablished in 1966
1966 disestablishments in Tennessee
Public high schools in Tennessee
Defunct schools in Tennessee